Khasanbi Eduardovich Bidzhiyev (born 19 May 1966) is a Russian professional football coach and a former player. He is the manager of PFC Spartak Nalchik.

Club career
He made his professional debut in the Soviet Second League in 1983 for PFC Spartak Nalchik. He played 3 games in the UEFA Cup Winners' Cup 1997–98 for FC Lokomotiv Moscow.

Honours
 Russian Premier League runner-up: 1995.
 Russian Premier League bronze: 1994, 1998.
 Soviet Cup finalist: 1990.
 Russian Cup winner: 1997.
 Russian Professional Football League Zone South Best Manager: 2015–16.

References

External sources
 

1966 births
Living people
Soviet footballers
Russian footballers
PFC Spartak Nalchik players
PFC Spartak Nalchik managers
FC SKA Rostov-on-Don players
PFC CSKA Moscow players
FC Lokomotiv Moscow players
Russian Premier League players
Hapoel Petah Tikva F.C. players
Hapoel Tel Aviv F.C. players
Expatriate footballers in Israel
Russian expatriate footballers
Sportspeople from Nalchik
Association football goalkeepers
Russian expatriate sportspeople in Israel
Russian football managers